C-class submarine may refer to:

British C-class submarine, the last class of petrol engined submarines of the Royal Navy
United States C-class submarine, five boats built for the United States Navy
Japanese Type C 1st class submarine, two classes submarines:
Type C submarine
I-52-class submarine (Type C3 submarine)
Japanese Type C 3rd class submarine, three classes submarines:
Ha-1-class submarine (Type C1 submarine)
Ha-3-class submarine (Type C2 submarine)
Ha-7-class submarine (Type C3 submarine)